Manuel Fernández Ginés (born 25 February 1971 in La Zubia) is a retired Spanish cyclist. He was professional from 1993 to 2000 and won the Spanish National Road Race Championships in 1996.

Palmarès

1992
2nd overall Vuelta a Navarra

1993
2nd overall Clásica de Sabiñánigo
3rd overall Vuelta a Mallorca

1995
2nd overall Circuito de Getxo
3rd overall Clásica a los Puertos de Guadarrama
3rd overall Tour of Galicia

1996
Spanish National Road Race Championships
Trofeo Zumaquero

1997
Vuelta a Asturias
General classification
5th stage

Results on the major tours

Tour de France
1996: 16th
1999: 49th

Giro d'Italia
1996: 21st

Vuelta a España
1994: 44th
1995: DNF
1998: 69th
1999: DNF

References

1971 births
Living people
Spanish male cyclists
Sportspeople from the Province of Granada
Olympic cyclists of Spain
Cyclists at the 1996 Summer Olympics
Cyclists from Andalusia
20th-century Spanish people
21st-century Spanish people